Hwang Yu-mi (Hangul: 황유미; born 18 March 1983) is a South Korean former badminton player. She competed at the 2004 and 2008 Summer Olympics.

Career 
In 2003, she won the silver medal at the Asian Championships in the women's doubles event. Hwang competed for South Korea in badminton at the 2004 Summer Olympics in women's doubles with partner Lee Hyo-jung.  They had a bye in the first round and defeated Cheng Wen-Hsing and Chien Yu Chin of Chinese Taipei in the second.  In the quarterfinals, Hwang and Lee lost to Zhao Tingting and Wei Yili of China 8-15, 15–6, 15–13.

Achievements

Asian Games
Women's doubles

Asian Championships
Women's doubles

World Junior Championships
Mixed doubles

Asian Junior Championships
Girls' doubles

Mixed doubles

BWF Grand Prix 
The BWF Grand Prix has two levels: Grand Prix and Grand Prix Gold. It is a series of badminton tournaments, sanctioned by Badminton World Federation (BWF) since 2007. The World Badminton Grand Prix sanctioned by International Badminton Federation since 1983.

Women's doubles

Mixed doubles

 BWF Grand Prix Gold tournament
 IBF/BWF Grand Prix tournament

BWF International Challenge/Series
Women's doubles

Mixed doubles

 BWF International Challenge tournament
 BWF International Series tournament
 BWF Future Series tournament

References

External links 
 
 

1983 births
Living people
Badminton players from Seoul
South Korean female badminton players
Badminton players at the 2004 Summer Olympics
Badminton players at the 2008 Summer Olympics
Olympic badminton players of South Korea
Asian Games medalists in badminton
Badminton players at the 2002 Asian Games
Badminton players at the 2006 Asian Games
Asian Games silver medalists for South Korea
Asian Games bronze medalists for South Korea
Medalists at the 2002 Asian Games
Medalists at the 2006 Asian Games